This is a list of family relations of current and former National Lacrosse League players.

Brothers

 Bergey: Jake and Josh 
 Bomberry: Cam, Cory, and Tim 
 Carnegie: Mike and Scott
 Currier: Josh and Zach
 Dawson: Dan and Paul 
 Evans: Shawn, Steve, and Scott 
 French: Mike and Paul French 
 Gait: Gary and Paul 
 Greer: Bill and Zack 

 Harnett: Greg and Jon
 Jenner: Teddy and Fred 
 Kilgour: Darris, Richie, and Travis 
 King: Jesse and Marshal
 LeClair: Kellen and Liam
 Malawsky: Curt and Derek 
 Martin: Spencer and Andrew
 Merrill: Brodie and Patrick 
 Morgan: David, Richard, and Peter 
 Noble: Jason and Jeremy 
 Orleman: Kevin and Steven
 Peyser: Greg and Stephen 
 Powell: Casey and Ryan 
 Reinholdt: Reid and Tor
 Resetarits: Frank and Joe 
 Sanderson: (players) Ryan and Chris, also Brandon, Phil, and Nate 
 Sanderson: (coaches) Terry, Lindsay, and Shane 
 Self: Scott and Brad 
 Snider: Geoff and Bob 
 Squire: Kim and Rodd 
 Staats: Randy and Austin
 Suddons: Derek and Wes 
 Tavares: John and Peter 
 Thompson: Lyle, Miles, Jerome and Jeremy
 Wray: Devan and Taylor

Fathers - sons
 Castle: J.R. Castle and George Castle  
 Sanderson: Terry and Josh 
 Sanderson: Lindsay and Phil, Brandon, Nate

Cousins
 Evans: Shawn and Turner
 Sanderson: Ryan and Chris (brothers), Brandon, Nate and Phil (brothers), Josh

Uncles - nephews
 Sanderson: Lindsay and Chris, Josh, Ryan 
 Sanderson: Terry and Brandon, Chris, Phil, Ryan, Nate 
 Veltman: Jim and Peter, Daryl 
 McCready: Pat and Joel

Brothers-in-law
 Mike Hasen and Pat O'Toole 
 Bill and Zack Greer and Dan and Paul Dawson (Bill Greer married Dawson's older sister) 
 Billy Dee Smith and Mark Steenhuis

References

Families
Families
National Lacrosse